Bengt Anders Ingvar Thornberg (born 1959) is the former Director-General and Head of the Swedish Security Service (Säpo), appointed on 5 July 2012. Thornberg has been an employee of the security service since 1990, notably serving as deputy chief of the security service (from July 1, 2011).

On 1 February 2018, Thornberg was appointed National Police Commissioner, effective 15 February 2018.

References 

1959 births
Living people
Swedish civil servants
Swedish police officers
People from Halmstad